|}

The Knight Frank Juvenile Hurdle is a Grade 2 National Hunt hurdle race in Ireland. It is run at Leopardstown in December over a distance of about 2 miles (3,219 metres) and during the race there are eight flights of hurdles to be jumped.

The race is normally run on St. Stephen's Day, during the course's Christmas Festival and is restricted to 3 year old horses only. It has been run under a series of sponsored titles - the 2012 running was called the Q8 Oil Juvenile Hurdle, the 2011 running was sponsored by the United Arab Emirates Embassy and in 2010 it was sponsored by the Bord na Móna peat harvesting company and run as the Bord na Mona Fire Magic Juvenile Hurdle. Prior to 2009 it was known as the Durkan New Homes Juvenile Hurdle and in 2009 it was run as the Inforthenight.ie Juvenile Hurdle.

In the 1990s the race was known as the Dennys Juvenile Hurdle.

Records
Leading jockey since 1987 (3 wins):
 Davy Russell – 	Carlito Brigante (2009), His Excellency (2011), Fil Dor (2021) 

Leading trainer since 1987  (5 wins):
 Willie Mullins – Clear Riposte (2005), Blood Cotil (2012), Apple's Jade (2015), Bapaume (2016), Lossiemouth (2022)

Winners since 1987

See also
 Horse racing in Ireland
 List of Irish National Hunt races

References
Racing Post:

National Hunt races in Ireland
National Hunt hurdle races
Leopardstown Racecourse